Muschamp Vesey, M.A. (1688–1762) was an Irish Anglican priest.

Vesey was born in County Galway and educated at Trinity College, Dublin, He was a Precentor of Killaloe Cathedral from 1713 to 1729; and  Archdeacon of Leighlin from 1735  until his death.

Notes

Alumni of Trinity College Dublin
Irish Anglicans
1762 deaths
1688 births
People from County Galway
Archdeacons of Leighlin